The men's 50 m freestyle was held at the Melbourne Sports and Aquatic Centre (MSAC) on the 20th and 21 March 2006.

Men's 50 m Freestyle - Final

Men's 50 m Freestyle - SemiFinals

Men's 50 m Freestyle - Semifinal 01

Men's 50 m Freestyle - Semifinal 02

Men's 50 m Freestyle - Heats

Men's 50 m Freestyle - Heat 01

Men's 50 m Freestyle - Heat 02

Men's 50 m Freestyle - Heat 03

Men's 50 m Freestyle - Heat 04

Men's 50 m Freestyle - Heat 05

Men's 50 m Freestyle - Heat 06

Swimming at the 2006 Commonwealth Games